Mount Tripyramid is multi-summited mountain ridge in the Alaska Range, in Denali National Park and Preserve. The main ridge extends along a southwest-northeast line with West Pyramid Peak, Central Pyramid Peak and East Pyramid Peak. Mount Brooks ends the ridge to the north and Mount Silverthrone is to the south.  The ridge is bounded by Traleika Glacier to the west and Brooks Glacier to the east. The mountain was named by Bradford Washburn in 1945 after Mount Tripyramid in New Hampshire.

See also
Mountain peaks of Alaska

References

Alaska Range
Landforms of Denali Borough, Alaska
Denali National Park and Preserve
Ridges of Alaska